The Enterprise School is a historic school building in rural central-western Madison County, Arkansas.  It is located at the junction of County Roads 6041 and 192.  It is a single-story wood-frame structure, basically rectangular in shape, with a metal roof, weatherboard siding, and a concrete foundation.  Its roof has exposed rafter ends in the Craftsman style, and it has a double-door entry sheltered by a gabled porch supported by sloping posts.  Built about 1935, its construction was probably funded by a Depression-era jobs program.

The building was listed on the National Register of Historic Places in 1992.

See also
National Register of Historic Places listings in Madison County, Arkansas

References

School buildings on the National Register of Historic Places in Arkansas
Colonial Revival architecture in Arkansas
Schools in Madison County, Alabama
National Register of Historic Places in Madison County, Arkansas
1935 establishments in Arkansas
School buildings completed in 1935
American Craftsman architecture in Arkansas